Lasiocladus is a genus of flowering plants belonging to the family Acanthaceae.

Its native range is Madagascar.

Species:

Lasiocladus anthospermifolius 
Lasiocladus capuronii 
Lasiocladus rufopilus 
Lasiocladus villosus

References

Acanthaceae
Acanthaceae genera